Tvetenia is a genus of non-biting midges of the bloodworm family Chironomidae.

Chironomidae
Diptera of Europe
Taxa named by Jean-Jacques Kieffer
Nematocera genera